This is a list of the German Media Control Top100 Singles Chart number-ones of 1997.

Number-one hits by week

See also
 List of number-one hits (Germany)

Notes

References

 German Singles Chart Archives from 1956
 Media Control Chart Archives from 1960

Number-one singles
Germany
1997
1997